Deux Mamelles National Park (French: Parc National Naturel de Deux Mamelles) is a national park in Haiti established on September 23, 2015 with an area of 2,265 hectares. It is located on the Tiburon Peninsula of Haiti, just west of a line connecting Les Anglais to the south and Jérémie to the north. The park circumscribes a U-shaped mountain, Morne Deux Mamelles, reaching 1,276 meters in elevation and is the highest mountain at the western end of the Tiburon Peninsula. Patches of the original (primary) forest remain at elevations above 1,000 meters, growing on highly dissected limestone rock.

The park is not accessible by road, making it difficult to access. In 2011, founders of the Haiti National Trust made a visit by helicopter to explore the area and collect data on the rich biodiversity. The results of that work led to its establishment as a national park.

See also 
 List of national parks of Haiti
 Haiti National Trust

References

National parks of Haiti